Hiero (Greek: Ἱέρων, Hiéron) is a minor work by Xenophon, set as a dialogue between Hiero, tyrant of Syracuse, and the lyric poet Simonides about 474 BC.  The dialogue is a response to the assumption that a tyrant's life is more pleasant than a commoner's. Having lived as both, Hiero breaks down this misconception, arguing that a tyrant does not have any more access to happiness than a private person.

The dialogue, like many of Xenophon's works, does not receive much scholarly attention today. However, it was the nominal subject of Leo Strauss' analysis On Tyranny, which initiated his famous dialogue with Alexandre Kojève on the role of philosophy in politics.

External links

 Hiero original text and translation at Perseus Project
 Hiero full text in English from Project Gutenberg

Works by Xenophon
Philosophy books
Ancient Syracuse
Political philosophy in ancient Greece